Stanley Hirst is the name of:

 Arthur Stanley Hirst (1883-1930), English entomologist
 Stanley Hirst (trade unionist) (1876-1950), English trade unionist and chair of the Labour Party

See also
 Stan Hurst (1911–1993), English footballer